Rupgadh Fort or Roopgadh Fort is a fort located in Dang district of Gujarat, India. Rupgarh Fort was originally the fort of the Bhil kings which was later taken over by the Gaekwads. This fort is an example of 17th-century Dangi mountain architecture.

History 
Pilaji Rao Gaikwad of Gaikwad dynasty built this fort in 1721 and made Songadh the capital of his state. His son Damaji Rao shifted the capital to Vadodara later.

Fort 
Fort has water storage facilities and a place to store ammunition and food. This fort is 1,670 feet above sea level, a climb of 780 feet from the Bhangrapani forest checkpost.

There is water sprint on the north direction of fort and a small temple of Hanuman beside it. A few cannons lie near this temple. One can reach the fort using two routes. A vehicle can reach the fort from Kalibel village via Popatbari village in an hour. From the north side, Vadirupgadh village of Songadh can be used to reach the fort.

Gallery

References

External links 
 Information about Roopgadh Fort

Forts in Gujarat
Dang district, India
Maratha princely states
Panchayati raj (India)
18th-century fortifications
Fortifications articles needing attention to supporting materials